Seventeen Tomatoes: Tales from Kashmir is a book of linked stories by Jaspreet Singh. It revolves around two boys coming of age in Kashmir. Published by Véhicule Press and IndiaInk, it was awarded the 2004 McAuslan First Book Prize. The Indian edition spells the title as 17 Tomatoes.

External links
 Canadian Publisher's site
 Indian Publisher's site
 Zoetrope

Indian short story collections
2003 short story collections